McCue is an Irish surname.

Notable people with the surname include: 

 Alec McCue, Scottish footballer
 Anne McCue, an Australian country singer
 Clarrie McCue (1927–1992), former administrative head of the Australian Antarctic Territory
 Duncan McCue, Canadian television reporter
 Frances McCue, an award-winning poet and arts administrator
 Gerald M. McCue (born 1928), American architect
 Harry McCue, former Irish footballer and manager
 Jane McCue Sands, sponsor of the US Navy destroyer USS Sands (DD-243)
 J. J. McCue, a former mayor of Boise, Idaho
 James A. McCue, U.S. Navy, radio mechanic for whom Mount McCue is named
 John McCue (footballer) (1922–1999) an English football player.
 John B. McCue, US politician
 Kate McCue, American cruise ship captain
 Loretta B. McCue, sponsor of the US Navy minesweeper USS Sagacity (MSO-469)
 Martin G. McCue (1875–1932), New York politician
 Mike McCue, co-founder of Tellme Networks
 Patrick McCue (1883–1962), Australian dual-code rugby footballer
 Paul McCue (born 1958), British military historian and writer
 Tommy McCue, English rugby league footballer
 Ruth McCue Bell, the maiden name of Ruth Graham

Fictional characters:
 Father McCue, a minor character in the television series The X-Files

See also
 Peter McCue, a racehorse
 The McCue Center, a building at the University of Virginia named after Dr. Frank C. Mccue III
 The original name of Friend, Kansas, after Basil M. McCue
 Mount McCue, a mountain in Antarctica, named for James A. McCue

References